Luke Johnston (born 3 September 1993) is a Scottish professional footballer who formerly played for Dundee United, making two appearances in the Scottish Premier League in 2013. He also played for Dunfermline Athletic and Montrose on loan before leaving Dundee United in 2014.

Career

Johnston was attached to Rangers as a youth player before his family emigrated to Australia when he was aged fourteen, where he played for Perth Glory. Returning to Scotland in November 2011, he joined Dundee United on a short term contract in January 2012 and went on to make a number of appearances for the club's under-19 team. He signed a new contract in the close season of 2012 and began to feature in the first team squad towards the end of the campaign. Johnston made his first team debut as a substitute against Ross County in April 2013, and also played from the start in the next match against St Johnstone. He spent the next season on loan at Dunfermline Athletic and Montrose, but then left Dundee United at the end of the season following the expiry of his contract.

Career statistics

References

1993 births
Living people
Scottish footballers
Association football defenders
Dundee United F.C. players
Dunfermline Athletic F.C. players
Scottish Premier League players
Scottish Professional Football League players
Footballers from Kirkcaldy
Montrose F.C. players
Scottish emigrants to Australia